Ivano Staccioli (3 January 1927 – 15 July 1995) was an Italian film actor.

Staccioli made 70 appearances between 1960 and 1991, mostly in film. He is best known for his appearances in historical adventures and action or western films in the 1960s. Particularly in the early 1960s he appeared in many gladiatorial films or ancient epics. In 1965 he starred in the western 30 Winchester per El Diablo and A 008, operazione Sterminio, a spoof of the James Bond genre.

In the mid to late 1960s he was often credited as John Heston for Italian films dubbed for the American audience, particularly his westerns. He also appeared in a number of Italian giallo films, such as La morte accarezza a mezzanotte and The Flower with the Petals of Steel.  Two of his last films before retiring were controversial Nazi death camp films, KZ9" and SS Girls, both directed by Bruno Mattei.

 Selected filmography 

 Pia de' Tolomei (1958)
 Knight Without a Country (1959)
 The Nights of Lucretia Borgia (1959) - Fossombrone
 The Loves of Salammbo' (1960) - Gell
 Lipstick (1960) - Dott. Mauri
 Cleopatra's Daughter (1960)
 La grande vallata (1961)
 Spade senza bandiera (1961) - Jester
 Blood Feud (1961)
 The Centurion (1961) - Hippolytus
 Ursus and the Tartar Princess (1961) - Prince Ahmed
 Ultimatum alla vita (1962) - Nazi soldier
 Il vecchio testamento (1962) 
 Triumph of the Ten Gladiators (1963) - Gladiator
 Rome Against Rome (1964) - Sirion
 Il ribelle di Castelmonte (1964) - Duke Alberto Di Castelmonte
 008: Operation Exterminate (1964) - Kemp
 30 Winchester per El Diablo (1965) - Black
 3 colpi di Winchester per Ringo (1966) - Daniels
 A... For Assassin (1966) - George Prescott
 The Sea Pirate (1966) - Decrees
 Il grande colpo di Surcouf (1966) - Decrees
 Two Sons of Ringo (1966) - Burt 'The Bear Trap'
 Kriminal (1966) - Alex Lafont
 Flashman (1967) - Kid
 The Long, the Short, the Cat (1967) - Il Gatto
 Any Gun Can Play (1967) - Il capitano
 Samoa, Queen of the Jungle (1968) - Pierre Moro
 God Made Them... I Kill Them (1968) - Judge Kincaid
 ...dai nemici mi guardo io! (1968) - Luis Garcia
 Commandos (1968) - Rodolfo - Radio Man
 The Nephews of Zorro (1968) - Captain Martines
 Lady Desire (1968)
 Cemetery Without Crosses (1969) - Vallee Brother
 La battaglia del deserto (1969) - Salter
 Quel giorno Dio non c'era (Il caso Defregger) (1969) - German Officer
 Formula 1: Nell'Inferno del Grand Prix (1970) - Jim Connors
 A Sword for Brando (1970)
 A Girl Called Jules (1970) - Professore di filosofia
 Le Mans, Shortcut to Hell (1970) - TV host (uncredited)
 Have a Good Funeral, My Friend... Sartana Will Pay (1970) - Blackie
 Road to Salina (1970) - Linda's Husband
 They Call Him Cemetery (1971) - Avelin
 African Story (1971) - Florio
 The Devil Has Seven Faces (1971) - Hank
 Los buitres cavarán tu fosa (1972) - Donovan
 Hai sbagliato... dovevi uccidermi subito! (1972) - Clinton
 So Sweet, So Dead (1972) - The Liar
 La morte accarezza a mezzanotte (1973) - Prof. Otto Wuttenberg
 Studio legale per una rapina (1973) - Felix
 Li chiamavano i tre moschettieri... invece erano quattro (1973) - Cardinal Richelieu
 The Flower with the Petals of Steel (1973) - Ispettore Garrano
 Afrika (1973) - Prof. Philip Stone
 Una donna per 7 bastardi (1974) - Smith
 Ciak si muore (1974) - Richard Hanson
 SS Girls (1977) - General Berger
 Gola profonda nera (1977) - Jose Depardieu
 KZ9 - Lager di sterminio (1977) - Wieker, the Camp Commander
 Ultimo confine (1994) - (final film role)

References

External links and sources 
 

Italian male film actors
1927 births
1995 deaths
20th-century Italian male actors